Tudicula is a genus of large sea snails, marine gastropod mollusks in the familyTurbinellidae.

In 1987, Rosenberg and Petit reassigned this to a new genus they created, Tudivasum.

Species
Species within the genus Tudicula used to  include:
 Tudicula inermis Angas, 1878 : synonym of Tudivasum inerme (Angas, 1878)
 Tudicula kurtzi Macpherson, 1964 : synonym of Tudivasum kurtzi (Macpherson, 1964)
 Tudicula rasilistoma Abbott, 1959 : synonym of Tudivasum rasilistoma (Abbott, 1959)
 Tudicula spinosa (H. & A. Adams, 1864) : synonym of Tudivasum spinosum (H. & A. Adams, 1864)
 Tudicula zanzibarica : synonym of Tudivasum zanzibaricum (Abbott, 1958)

References

 Nomenclator Zoologicus info

Turbinellidae